The  is a botanical garden located at 3-122 Mutsukawa, Minami-ku, Yokohama, Kanagawa Prefecture, Japan. It is open most days; an admission fee is charged.

The garden was founded in 1979.

See also 
 List of botanical gardens in Japan
 Yokohama War Cemetery - located across from the park

References 
 Yokohama Municipal Children's Botanical Garden (Japanese)
 BGCI entry

Botanical gardens in Japan
1979 establishments in Japan
Geography of Yokohama
Gardens in Kanagawa Prefecture
Tourist attractions in Yokohama